Pardines is a municipality in the comarca of Ripollès, province of Girona, Catalonia, Spain.

The highest point in the municipality is Puig Cerverís (2,202 m).
The municipality is bordered on the north by Queralbs and Vilallonga de Ter, on the east and south by Ogassa, and on the west by Ribes de Freser and Queralbs.

History
The name Pardines has its origins in the name parietinas, which means "building ruins." It is first documented in 839, in the act of consecration of Sant Ot d'Urgell. It was a possession of the counts of Cerdanya, the nobility of Sales, the monastery of Sant Martí de Canigó, and the counts of Barcelona.

Demographic evolution

Sights
 Church of Santa Magdalena
 Church of Sant Esteve
 Chapel of Santa Magdalena
 Chapel of Sant Martí
 Chapel of the Roser

References

 Panareda Clopés, Josep Maria; Rios Calvet, Jaume; Rabella Vives, Josep Maria (1989). Guia de Catalunya, Barcelona: Caixa de Catalunya.  (Spanish).  (Catalan).

External links
 Government data pages 

Municipalities in Ripollès
Populated places in Ripollès